So Plush was an American R&B group composed of Rhonda Roussel, Donielle Carter, Raquel Campbell and T. J. Lottie who was signed to Epic Records in the 1990s. Their debut single "Damn (Should've Treated U Right)" featuring Ja Rule was released in 1999 reached the top 40 of the Billboard charts. Their self-titled debut album arrived in October 2000. A second single "Things I Heard Before" charted on the BET weekly countdown.  The group appeared on episodes of The Parkers and The Steve Harvey Show.

References

American rhythm and blues musical groups
African-American girl groups